Joshua Opoku Okoampa (born October 10, 1984) is an American former soccer player. He played at Türkiyemspor Berlin.

Okoampa is currently an assistant coach at Century College in White Bear Lake, Minnesota. He also serves as Technical Director of the North Oaks Blast Soccer Club.

Career
A native of Brooklyn Park, Minnesota, Okoampa played college soccer at the University of Wisconsin-Green Bay. After scoring 14 goals and six assists his senior season Okoampa was named to the 2006 NSCAA/adidas Men's Collegiate All-America Third Team NCAA Division I. He was the fifth all-time scorer in school history with 36 career goals.

In February 2008 he joined Türkiyemspor Berlin of the fourth-tier Regionalliga Nord, signing a 2-year contract. Okoampa was forced to retire in August 2009 due to a leg injury.

Awards
 2006 NCAA Division I All-American
 2006 Horizon League Offensive Player of the Year
 2003-2006 Horizon League All-Conference First Team
 2002 Minnesota Gatorade HS Player of the Year
 2002 Minnesota All-State, All-Metro and Conference MVP
 2000-2002 All-Conference

References

1984 births
Living people
American expatriate soccer players
African-American soccer players
American sportspeople of Ghanaian descent
Soccer players from Minnesota
Türkiyemspor Berlin players
University of Wisconsin–Green Bay alumni
American soccer players
Association football forwards
21st-century African-American sportspeople
20th-century African-American people